Cedar Falls is an unincorporated community in Randolph County, North Carolina, United States. Cedar Falls has a post office with ZIP code 27230, which opened on March 4, 1878.

References

Unincorporated communities in Randolph County, North Carolina
Unincorporated communities in North Carolina